Canadian National 242 was a passenger train that operated on Canadian National's lines.

Steam explosion 
CN 242 suffered a serious explosion when on August 9, 1941, when it collided with a stationary engine at the Turcot Yard in Montreal Quebec. The yard lands were a brownfield that was re-habilitated for the Highway Interchange of Autoroute 40 and 20 in West Montreal. The fireman died and 53 people were injured.

"CNR passenger train #242 from Vaudreuil collides with a stationary switch engine in the Turcot Yards... the locomotive and two cars of the passenger train are derailed. The fireman is killed and the engineer is severely burned when the boiler ruptures... 53 passengers are injured."

See also 
List of rail accidents (1930–49)

1941 in Canada
Canadian National Railway
Disasters in Quebec
History of Montreal
Railway accidents in 1941
Railway accidents and incidents in Canada
Railway boiler explosions
Accidents and incidents involving Canadian National Railway
August 1941 events